Ariel Griseldo Reyes (born 11 June 1987 in Florencio Varela) is an Argentine association footballer who plays for Estudiantes de la Plata.

Career 
Reyes began his career with Estudiantes de la Plata and played than from January 2007 to June 2008 for Ferro Carril Oeste. After his return from Ferro Carril Oeste to Estudiantes de la Plata joined on 26 August 2008 to FC Locarno on loan for one season.

References

External links
football.ch profile 

1987 births
Living people
Sportspeople from Buenos Aires Province
Argentine footballers
Argentine expatriate footballers
Expatriate footballers in Switzerland
Ferro Carril Oeste footballers
FC Locarno players
Association football midfielders